Yesenia Centeno Sousa (born June 27, 1971, in Ciego de Ávila, Cuba) is a Spanish marathon runner. In 2003, she adopted Spanish nationality in order to compete internationally for the marathon. Five years later, she achieved a top-ten finish at the Fortis Rotterdam Marathon, and also, set her personal best time of 2:31:16 by finishing fourth at the Hamburg Marathon.

At age thirty-seven, Centeno made her official debut for the 2008 Summer Olympics in Beijing, where she competed in the women's marathon, along with her compatriots Alessandra Aguilar and María José Pueyo. She finished the race in forty-fifth place by less than a second ahead of Portugal's Ana Dias, with a time of 2:36:25.

Centeno is a member of Club Atletico Valencia Terra i Mar in Valencia, Spain, being coached and trained by Guillermo Ferrero.

In 2009, she tested positive for illegal substances, Methandriol and Furosemide, and was subsequently disqualified for two years.

See also
List of eligibility transfers in athletics

Notes

References

External links
 
 
 
 

Spanish female marathon runners
Cuban female marathon runners
Spanish people of Cuban descent
Living people
Olympic athletes of Spain
Athletes (track and field) at the 2008 Summer Olympics
Athletes (track and field) at the 1991 Pan American Games
Athletes (track and field) at the 1995 Pan American Games
People from Ciego de Ávila
Sportspeople from Valencia
1971 births
Doping cases in athletics
Spanish sportspeople in doping cases
Pan American Games competitors for Cuba